Robbie Koenig and Thomas Shimada were the defending champions but only Koenig competed that year with Petr Pála.

Koenig and Pála lost in the semifinals to Martin Damm and Cyril Suk.

Damm and Suk won in the final 6–4, 6–4 against Jürgen Melzer and Alexander Peya.

Seeds
Champion seeds are indicated in bold text while text in italics indicates the round in which those seeds were eliminated.

  Wayne Arthurs /  Paul Hanley (quarterfinals)
  Martin Damm /  Cyril Suk (champions)
  Wayne Black /  Kevin Ullyett (quarterfinals)
  František Čermák /  Leoš Friedl (first round)

Draw

External links
 2003 Generali Open Doubles Draw

Austrian Open Kitzbühel
2003 ATP Tour